This is a list of animated television series first aired in 1993.

Anime television series first aired in 1993

See also
 List of animated feature films of 1993
 List of Japanese animation television series of 1993

References

Television series
Animated series
1993
1993
1993-related lists